Comic's Choice is a British comedy chat show hosted by the comedian Bill Bailey, and broadcast on Channel 4. The programme ran for a single series of five episodes, and was shown during January 2011. Each episode, Bailey would interview another British comedian, and invite them to discuss some of their favourite comedians or comedy television programmes. The series was produced by Unique Television Production.

History 
Comic's Choice was broadcast in anticipation of the British Comedy Awards, which were being shown on Channel 4 for the first time on 22 January 2011, having been broadcast on ITV for 20 years – Comic's Choice was broadcast in the week leading up the event. The five guests on the show were Alan Davies, Lee Mack, Jo Brand, Jessica Hynes and Sean Lock. Each guest picked three nominations for various British Comedy Award categories (such as Best Sitcom and Best Male Comic), and would then discuss them and select their winner during the episode. Discussing the show, its producers stated: "With other smaller, alternative categories and audience interaction thrown in, the show will be not just informative and entertaining – but fun, funny and memorable."

Reviews of Comic's Choice were generally positive, with Steven Cookson of Suite 101 describing it as "a great deal of fun". Bailey's hosting was praised, with Tom Sutcliffe of The Independent calling him the programme's "saving grace", and stating: "[He's] got a manner that somehow makes the format work." A review of a more critical nature came from Henry Venning of The Stage, who described the show's format as "flimsy" and "confusing".

Episodes
Winners are given in bold. The Guilty Pleasure category had only one nominee.

References

External links

 Production website

2010s British comedy television series
2011 British television series debuts
2011 British television series endings
British television talk shows
Channel 4 comedy
English-language television shows
Television shows set in London
2010s British television talk shows